Bloodline is an American Netflix original thriller–drama television series created by Todd A. Kessler, Glenn Kessler, and Daniel Zelman. The series stars Kyle Chandler, Ben Mendelsohn, Linda Cardellini, Norbert Leo Butz, Sam Shepard, and Sissy Spacek among the main cast, and it focuses on the lives of the Rayburn family, which owns and runs an oceanfront hotel in the Florida Keys. The first 13-episode season premiered on Netflix, on March 20, 2015. The second season, comprising 10 episodes, was released on May 27, 2016. On July 13, 2016, the series was renewed for a 10-episode third season, later confirmed to be the final season. The third and final season was released on May 26, 2017.

Series overview

Episodes

Season 1 (2015)

Season 2 (2016)

Season 3 (2017)

References

External links
 
 

Lists of American drama television series episodes